Tom Foster was an Australian Aboriginal musician. A member of the Tharawal people, he was born in New South Wales and lived for some time on the mission at Le Perouse. He composed at least two spiritual songs which were performed for public occasions. The music was well-received in Christian circles.

Foster was active in representing Aboriginal people.

Foster married and had three sons, Fred, Amos and Tommy, who each continued his performing legacy. He died in Kingsford in December 1940.

Works
 1930 My Thoughts 
 1930 I'm Happy Today

Performances
In 1935, Foster entertained the Governor of New South Wales at a ball for charity.

Foster's gum-Leaf band was regarded as famous at the 1935 celebration of the silver jubilee of King George V.

Foster also promoted his Aboriginal culture through his use of boomerangs.

A photograph of Foster demonstrating his boomerang technique is preserved in the National Library of Australia.
Some of the boomerangs he manufactured are also preserved.

References

1870 births
1940 deaths
Australian indigenous rights activists
People from New South Wales
Indigenous rights activists
20th-century Australian male musicians
20th-century Australian musicians
Indigenous Australians in New South Wales
Eora people
Aboriginal peoples of New South Wales
Indigenous Australian musicians